The Astronaut is a 1972 American made-for-television science fiction film directed by Robert Michael Lewis and starring Jackie Cooper and Monte Markham. This made-for-television film follows a man who has been hired to impersonate an astronaut who died during the first crewed mission to Mars. The movie was made for ABC for its movie of the week franchise. Real-life astronaut Wally Schirra appears in a cameo role as himself.

Plot

Television coverage of Brice Randolph, the first astronaut on the surface of Mars, is interrupted, indicating the signal has been lost.  Shortly afterward, Eddie Reese is recruited, and shown what happened after the TV signal was interrupted: Brice reported something penetrating his EVA suit, and soon expired. The other astronaut lifted off alone.  NASA (who fear their project will be canceled) needs to keep it secret until they have answers about what exactly happened.

Reese is surgically altered, and begins learning his role as Brice.  At the arrival of the spacecraft back on Earth, the splashdown site is altered so that the press is unaware of Reese being brought to join the returning space crew, and Reese, maintaining the cover, is now having to act his role with the dead man's wife Gail.  Uneasy about being intimate with another man's wife, Reese unwittingly betrays himself to her, and her suspicions are raised.

Eventually, NASA determines what happened on Mars, and is ready to let Reese out of the masquerade, but Reese and Gail are willing to carry on as if he is Brice Randolph.  Reese then hears from a boy, who asked for an autograph, that the Soviets have just launched their own mission to land on Mars.

NASA does not warn the Soviet of what dangers await them, however, Reese and Gail reveal the truth.

Cast

Reception

AllMovies gave the move 2.5 out of 5 stars. The Encyclopedia of Science Fiction stated that this largely-forgotten film is a major curiosity. It was aired when the Apollo missions to the Moon were still under way. The movie presents a negative view of NASA. According to the encyclopedia, a strong case can be made that Capricorn One plagiarized this film's central situation.

See also
 List of American films of 1972

References

External links
 
 

1972 films
1972 television films
1970s English-language films
1970s science fiction films
American science fiction films
Films produced by Harve Bennett
Films with screenplays by Harve Bennett
Mars in film
Films about astronauts
Films about NASA
Films scored by Gil Mellé
ABC Movie of the Week
Films directed by Robert Michael Lewis
1970s American films